Aku Pellinen (born 17 May 1993) is a Finnish racing driver currently competing in the TCR International Series. Having previously competed in the European Touring Car Cup and Porsche Carrera Cup Italy amongst others.

Racing career
Pellinen began his career in 2000 in karting. He switched to the Finnish V1600 Cup for 2009, winning the championship in 2010. He then went on to compete in the Trofeo Abarth 500 Europe series in 2011, taking the title in 2012. He switched to the Italian SEAT Ibiza Cup for 2013 having raced a single weekend in the championship in 2012, he finished 3rd in the championship standings in 2013. He also raced a single weekend in Formula Abarth that year. In 2014 he took 4 victories, 4 podiums, 4 fastest laps and 1 pole position on his way to finishing 3rd in the European Touring Car Cup. He also made a guest appearance in the SEAT León Eurocup series in 2014. He switched to the Porsche Carrera Cup Italy series in 2015, finishing 7th in the championship standings. That year he also raced two weekends in the Porsche Supercup.

In March 2016 it was announced that he would race in the TCR International Series, driving a Honda Civic TCR for WestCoast Racing.

Racing record

Complete TCR International Series results
(key) (Races in bold indicate pole position) (Races in italics indicate fastest lap)

† Driver did not finish the race, but was classified as he completed over 75% of the race distance.

References

External links 

 
 

1993 births
Living people
Sportspeople from Tampere
TCR International Series drivers
Finnish racing drivers